Calgary-Foothills is a provincial electoral district for the Legislative Assembly of Alberta, Canada. It is located in the northwest corner of Calgary. It elected six consecutive Progressive Conservative MLAs from its creation in 1971 until ousted Premier Jim Prentice disclaimed his winning seat on the 2015 general election night, later electing a member of the Wildrose in the following by-election.

The riding contains the neighbourhoods of Edgemont, Hidden Valley, Hamptons and the Symons Valley neighbourhoods of Sage Hill, Nolan Hill, Sherwood and Kincora.

History
The electoral district of Calgary-Foothills was created in the 1971 boundary redistribution from most of the area that comprised the old electoral district of Calgary Bowness.

The 2010 boundary redistribution saw only minor revisions made to the electoral district. The district's northern boundary was moved northward, adding a rural portion of Foothills-Rocky View riding, where the city of Calgary annexed new land. The district lost the neighbourhood of Citadel which was moved into the new riding of Calgary-Hawkwood.

From 1993 to 2004, the riding included the neighbourhoods of Hamptons, Hidden Valley, Edgermont, MacEwan, Dalhousie and Brentwood as well as Nose Hill Park.

Boundary history

Representation history

Calgary-Foothills was created in 1971 mostly from the predecessor district Calgary Bowness. That district had previously returned Social Credit MLA's from 1959 and 1963 and returned Progressive Conservative candidate Len Werry in the 1967 election. That district was abolished in 1971 and Werry ran as the incumbent in Foothills in the election held that year. He won the new district with over half the popular vote to take the new district for his party. Premier Peter Lougheed who had just formed government appointed Werry as Minister of Telephones and Utilities. On February 25, 1973, he died in a car accident resulting in a by-election several months later.

The 1973 by-election was a hotly contested race featuring a number of Alberta political party leaders. The riding returned Progressive Conservative candidate Stewart McCrae who held the riding with 44% of the popular vote. He defeated Social Credit leader Werner Schmidt who finished a strong second. The results of the by-election proved devastating to the Social Credit party who suffered from internal problems after Schmidt was unable to win a seat.

McCrae ran for a second term in the 1975 general election. He was re-elected with a landslide majority and appointed to cabinet by Lougheed after the election as the Minister responsible for Calgary Affairs. He was re-elected for his third term in the 1979 general election and kept his seat in cabinet this time becoming Minister of Government Services. McCrae retired at dissolution of the assembly in 1982.

The third representative was Janet Koper who was returned as a Progressive Conservative candidate in the 1982 general election with a landslide majority. She was re-elected in the 1986 election with a reduced majority. On December 18, 1988, Koper died. The electoral district remained vacant until the March 1989 election.

Pat Black was fourth representative in the riding. She was returned in the 1989 election holding the district was just 37% of the popular vote. She was appointed to the provincial cabinet as Minister of Energy when Premier Ralph Klein took power in 1992. She was reelected with a solid majority in 1993 and kept her seat in cabinet.

Black won her third term in office in the 1997 election with over 60% of the popular vote. After the election she became the new Minister of Economic Development and Tourism. In 1998 she got married and changed her last name to Nelson. In 1999 she was shuffled to be the Minister of Government Services. Nelson won re-election to her fourth term in the 2001 election winning a very large majority. She became the Minister of Finance until she retired from public office dissolution of the assembly in 2004.

The 2004 election returned Progressive Conservative candidate Len Webber. He won his second and third terms in 2008 and 2012. In March 2014 Webber left the PC caucus to sit as an independent. Webber resigned from the legislature thus giving Premier Jim Prentice, the new leader of the Progressive Conservative Party, an opportunity to seek the seat in a by-election in 2014. In the 2015 provincial election, Prentice led the Progressive Conservative government to defeat but retained his seat. Nevertheless, he resigned both the party leadership and his seat in the legislature, upon the announcement of the election results.

The subsequent by-election elected Prasad Panda of the Wildrose Party, who was the first non-PC MLA returned from Calgary-Foothills. In second place was NDP candidate Bob Hawkesworth, with PC candidate Blair Houston finishing third overall.

Legislature results

1971 general election

1973 by-election

|}
Modernization Society of Alberta candidate source: Calgary Herald June 26, 1973

1975 general election

1979 general election

1982 general election

1986 general election

1989 general election

1993 general election

1997 general election

2001 general election

2004 general election

2008 general election

2012 general election

2014 by-election

2015 general election

2015 by-election

2019 general election

Senate nominee results

2004 Senate nominee election district results

Voters had the option of selecting 4 Candidates on the Ballot

2012 Senate nominee election district results

Student Vote results

2004 election

On November 19, 2004, a Student Vote was conducted at participating Alberta schools to parallel the 2004 Alberta general election results. The vote was designed to educate students and simulate the electoral process for persons who have not yet reached the legal majority. The vote was conducted in 80 of the 83 provincial electoral districts with students voting for actual election candidates. Schools with a large student body that reside in another electoral district had the option to vote for candidates outside of the electoral district then where they were physically located.

2012 election

References

External links 
Website of the Legislative Assembly of Alberta

Alberta provincial electoral districts
Politics of Calgary